Arturo Chávez may refer to:

 Arturo Chávez Chávez (born 1960), Mexican prosecutor and Attorney General of Mexico
 Arturo Chávez (athlete) (born 1990), Peruvian high jumper